Lawrence Walker (1901–1976) was an international cricketer for Ireland national cricket team.

References

1901 births
1976 deaths
Irish cricketers